Erich Paulun (born 4 March 1862 in Pasewalk; died 5 March 1909 in Shanghai) was a German naval surgeon. After leaving active duty in 1899, he founded together with the German doctor Oscar von Schab the Tung Chee Hospital for Chinese (Tung-Chee in Pinyin: Tongji). He founded the Shanghai German medicine school in 1907, the German government established the "German Medical School for Chinese in Shanghai". Paulun was the founding rector. Today, Tongji Medical College of Huazhong University of Science and Technology in Wuhan relies on this foundation.

1862 births
1909 deaths
Founders of academic institutions
19th-century German physicians
German expatriates in Hong Kong
German expatriates in China
People from Pasewalk
People from the Province of Pomerania
Medical education in China
Naval surgeons